This is a list of countries by number of telephone lines mostly based on The World Factbook accessed in September 2010.

See also
 List of countries by number of broadband Internet subscriptions
 List of countries by number of Internet users
 List of countries by smartphone penetration
 List of mobile network operators
 List of multiple-system operators
 List of telephone operating companies

References

External links
Complete list

International telecommunications
Lists of countries by economic indicator